Homan (pronounced ) was an illegal Belarusian newspaper published from 1884 in Belarusian and Russian languages. It was printed in Minsk on a hectograph and promoted the idea of autonomy of Belarus.

References
 [Turuk 1921]  Ф. Турук. Белорусское движение. Очерк истории национального и революционного движения белоруссов. – Москва : Государственное издательство, 1921 ; Мн. : Картографическая фабрика Белгеодезии, 1994. p. 15

Newspapers published in Belarus
Newspapers established in 1884
Mass media in Minsk
1884 establishments in the Russian Empire